Alexandro-Nevsky is an urban locality (work settlement) and the administrative center of Alexandro-Nevsky District of Ryazan Oblast, Russia. Population:

References

Notes

Sources

Urban-type settlements in Ryazan Oblast
Ryazan Governorate